Leon "Bud" Lewis (born January 29, 1953) is an American former professional soccer player and coach. Known for his versatility on the field as a midfielder and forward, Lewis represented the Cincinnati Comets in the American Soccer League and the Buffalo Blazers in the Canadian National Soccer League in the mid-1970s. After retiring as a player, he served as the head coach for the men's soccer team at Wilmington College between 1975 and 2017.

Playing career

Early career

High school 
Lewis, a native of Penfield, New York, began his competitive soccer career at Penfield High School in 1967. He was a standout player for the school's soccer team and helped lead them to a New York State Section V championship in 1970. As a result of his outstanding performance on the field, Lewis was named a National High School All-American following his senior season.

College 
In 1971, Lewis won an athletic scholarship to attend Bowling Green State University in Bowling Green, Ohio. A four-year letter winner with the Bowling Green Falcons men's soccer team, he was named an NSCAA All-American in 1974. He also served as the team captain during the same season, alongside defender Steve Cabalka. Lewis' contributions to the Bowling Green Falcons soccer team were recognized in 2000 when he was inducted into the Bowling Green State University Athletic Hall of Fame.

Professional career 
Following a successful collegiate career, Lewis signed his first professional contract with the American Soccer League side the Cincinnati Comets for the 1975 ASL season. After only one season with the Comets, he joined the Buffalo Blazers of the Canadian National Soccer League in 1976. In 1977, he was part of the Blazers team that played a friendly against the Serie A team Lazio at the War Memorial Stadium in Buffalo, New York. Lewis started as a forward in a 1–6 loss.

Coaching career 

While still actively playing professional soccer, Lewis took on the role of part-time coach for the Wilmington College men's soccer team in 1975. In 1977, he became the full-time head coach for the team, known as the Fightin' Quakers. Lewis' tenure as head coach was highly successful, leading the team to multiple NAIA District 22, Association of Mideast Colleges, Heartland Collegiate Athletic Conference, and Ohio Athletic Conference titles during the years. In 2004, Lewis was awarded the Bill Jeffrey Award for reaching more than 400 victories and for his services to the NSCAA’s All-America program. He retired from coaching after the 2017 NCAA season, having served as head coach at Wilmington College for 43 consecutive seasons and racking up 506 victories in 843 games. In 2021, Lewis was inducted into the Wilmington College Athletic Hall of Fame in recognition of his coaching achievements.

Coaching statistics

Honors

Player 
Penfield High School

 New York State Section V Boys' Soccer: 1970
Bowling Green State University

 Mid-American Conference (MAC): 1973

Individual

 National High School All-American: 1970
 NSCAA All-American: 1974
 NSCAA All-Region (Midwest): 1974
NSCAA All-Ohio: 1974
OCSA All-Mid-American Conference (MAC): 1974
Bowling Green State University Athletic Hall of Fame: 2000

Coach 
Wilmington College

 NAIA District 22: 1979, 1981, 1983, 1985, 1989
 Association of Mideast Colleges (AMC): 1991, 1992, 1993, 1994, 1995
 Heartland Collegiate Athletic Conference (HCAC): 1998, 1999
Ohio Athletic Conference (OAC) Regular-Season Champion: 2000, 2004
 Ohio Athletic Conference (OAC) Tournament Champion: 2004

Individual

 NAIA District 22 Coach of the Year: 8 times
 NSCAA Mideast Coach of the Year: 6 times
 Ohio Coach of the Year: 3 times
 Association of Mideast Colleges (AMC) Coach of the Year: 3 times
 Ohio Athletic Conference (OAC) Coach of the Year: 2004, 2017
 Bill Jeffrey Award: 2004
 Wilmington College Athletic Hall of Fame: 2021

References 

Living people
1953 births
American soccer players
Association football forwards
Cincinnati Comets players
Bowling Green Falcons men's soccer players
Ohio State University alumni
People from Penfield, New York
Canadian National Soccer League players
American Soccer League (1933–1983) players
Soccer coaches in the United States
American soccer coaches
College men's soccer coaches in the United States